Välkommen till förorten is the debut album by Swedish hip hop group The Latin Kings. It proved to be very successful in Sweden and influenced many future Swedish hip hop acts. Välkommen till förorten stayed at the Swedish Top 60 chart for 20 weeks and peaked at the 9th spot. The album also spawned the charting singles "Snubben", "De e dej jag vill ha" and "Kompisar från förr". The Latin Kings re-released the album in Spanish as Bienvenido a mi barrio in 1995 under the name Los Reyes Latinos.

Track listing

Reception

Välkommen till förorten was very well received among Swedish critics and is now considered a classic Swedish hip hop album. The Latin Kings were praised for their lyrics about the Swedish society from a suburban view, both by the general public and politicians. Patrik Ekelöf of the website Dagens Skiva called the album "a milestone in Swedish music history" and "a tough and heavy dub-influenced record that described the suburban life in a way we never had heard before".

Charts

Album

Singles

References

1994 debut albums
The Latin Kings (hip hop group) albums